Ng Hui (born 22 July 1979) is a Singaporean educator, former actress and television host. She was prominently a full-time Mediacorp artiste from 2000 to 2012.

Biography
Ng attended Jin Shan Primary School, Raffles Girls' Secondary School and Hwa Chong Junior College and graduated from Nanyang Technological University (NTU) with a degree in Communication Studies. She was awarded the Outstanding Young Alumni Award by NTU in 2008.

While studying in NTU, Ng went on an internship with Mediacorp to learn to be an assistant director. On the set of Living with Lydia, the casting directors asked her to audition for the sitcom and was cast as Apple Lum, Lydia's daughter in the sitcom. This started her acting career with Mediacorp.

In 2006, Ng appeared in her first film, We are family.

Ng was best known for her award-winning role as 'Tao Jie' in The Little Nyonya and has acted in more than 20 dramas and hosted a number of variety shows.

Ng left the entertainment industry in 2012 as she has decided that she will devote her time and efforts to other areas apart from acting. She is currently working as an Allied Educator for Learning And Behavioural Support at a government primary school.

Filmography

Film

Television

Variety shows

Awards and nominations

References

External links
Official website
Profile on xin.msn.com

Living people
Singaporean people of Teochew descent
Singaporean television personalities
Singaporean television actresses
Singaporean film actresses
1979 births
Hwa Chong Junior College alumni
Nanyang Technological University alumni